Dhananjay Mahadik (born 5 November 1984) is a former Indian field hockey player who played as a defender for the national team. He was part of the team that won the bronze medal at the 2010 Asian Games and silver medal at the 2010 Commonwealth Games. Currently he is working in Department of Sales Tax, Government of Maharashtra as Assistant Commissioner of sales tax.

In 2013, Hockey India appointed Mahadik as the video analyst of the men's senior team.

References

External links
Player profile at bharatiyahockey.org

1984 births
Living people
Field hockey players from Mumbai
Indian male field hockey players
Commonwealth Games medallists in field hockey
Commonwealth Games silver medallists for India
Asian Games bronze medalists for India
Asian Games medalists in field hockey
Field hockey players at the 2010 Asian Games
Medalists at the 2010 Asian Games
Field hockey players at the 2010 Commonwealth Games
2010 Men's Hockey World Cup players
Medallists at the 2010 Commonwealth Games